Daniele Alves Lopes was a Brazilian teenager who jumped to her death from an office building in São Paulo's central business district. She was 16 years old. The suicide was filmed by a Brazilian news show, Aqui Agora and shown on SBT. This broadcast led to a surge in ratings, and a national conversation about the sensationalized, violent and amoral nature of that news show.

Death
On July 5, 1993, Daniele Lopes, despondent from a recent romantic break-up, climbed out on a 7th story parapet of an office building where she worked as a receptionist. While contemplating her fate, police and a news crew arrived and started filming. The events were filmed until after the girl jumped, but the scene was cut before she reached the ground.

When the unedited footage was shown on Brazilian national television, it caused a spike in ratings. Lopes' youth and broken heart may have romanticized and contributed to the interest in the incident.

An edited version of the suicide was also shown on American television, with commentary.

Aftermath
The Brazilian psychiatrist Jacob Pinheiro Goldberg was a prominent critical voice of the broadcast, stating it may cause a societal desensitization effect, and psychoanalyst Jurandir Freire Costa referred to the media as vultures. Other communication experts were also critical.

In 1994, the Alves Lopes family reached a R$ 1.05 million settlement with SBT for moral damage.

References

1993 deaths
Filmed suicides
Television controversies in Brazil
1993 in Brazil
Suicides by jumping in Brazil
1993 suicides